The 1923 Gonzaga Bulldogs football team was an American football team that represented Gonzaga University during the 1923 college football season. In their fourth year under head coach Gus Dorais, the Bulldogs compiled a 4–3 record and outscored all opponents by a total of 119 to 64.

Halfback Hust Stockton starred for the 1923 team. The Los Angeles Times called him "one of the most brilliant football players ever developed on the Pacific Coast". Stockton played five years in the NFL and is the grandfather of NBA great John Stockton.

Gonzaga's football team under Dorais was sometimes referred to as "little Notre Dame".

The team traveled 2,500 miles to play on Thanksgiving Day at the University of Detroit's new Dinan Field. Dorais left Gonzaga after the 1924 season to become the head football coach at the University of Detroit.

Schedule

References

Gonzaga
Gonzaga Bulldogs football seasons
Gonzaga Bulldogs football